The 1925 Rhode Island Rams football team was an American football team that represented the University of Rhode Island as a member of the New England Conference during the 1925 college football season. In its sixth season under head coach Frank Keaney, the team compiled a 2–5–1 record, going 0–1–1 against conference opponents.

Schedule

References

Rhode Island State
Rhode Island Rams football seasons
Rhode Island State Rams football